The Mexican burrowing tree frog (Smilisca), also known as the cross-banded tree frog, is a genus of  frogs in the family Hylidae found in Mexico, southern Texas and Arizona, Central America, and northwestern South America. In a recent revision of the Hylidae, the two species of the previous genus Pternohyla were included in this genus.
Its name is from the Ancient Greek  (‘little knife’), referring to the pointed frontoparietal processes.

Species

References

 . (1993): Amphibian species of the world – Univ. Kansas Publ. Mus. Nat. Hist. (Spec. Publ.), Kansas 21, pp. [1–372]

External links

 . 2007. Amphibian Species of the World: an Online Reference. Version 5.1 (10 October 2007). Smilisca. Electronic Database accessible at https://web.archive.org/web/20071024033938/http://research.amnh.org/herpetology/amphibia/index.php. American Museum of Natural History, New York, USA. (Accessed: April 23, 2008).
  [web application]. 2008. Berkeley, California: Smilisca. AmphibiaWeb, available at http://amphibiaweb.org/. (Accessed: April 23, 2008).

.
Frogs of North America
Mexican tree frog, burrowing
Mexican tree frog, burrowing
Mexican tree frog, burrowing
Hylinae
Taxa named by Edward Drinker Cope